Karaftohelix is a genus of air-breathing land snails, terrestrial pulmonate gastropod mollusks in the subfamily Bradybaeninae of the family Camaenidae.

Species
Species within the genus Karaftohelix include:
 Karaftohelix arcasiana (Crosse & Debeaux, 1863)
 Karaftohelix capillata (Schileyko & Bratchik in Schileyko, 1978)
 Karaftohelix dieckmanni (Mousson, 1887)
 Karaftohelix diversita (Schileyko & Bratchik in Schileyko, 1978)
 Karaftohelix duiensis (Westerlund, 1897)
 Karaftohelix fiscina (Fulton, 1905)
 Karaftohelix fragilis (Pilsbry, 1927)
 Karaftohelix incognita (Schileyko, 1988)
 Karaftohelix kudiensis (Cockerell, 1924)
 Karaftohelix kurodana (Pilsbry, 1927)
 Karaftohelix maacki (Gerstfeldt, 1859)
 Karaftohelix middendorffi (Gerstfeldt, 1859)
 Karaftohelix plana (Schileyko & Bakurov in Schileyko, 1988)
 Karaftohelix strelkovi (Likharev & Rammelmeyer, 1952)
 Karaftohelix ussuriensis (Westerlund, 1897)
 Karaftohelix vulcanica (Schileyko, 1978)
Species brought into synonymy
 Karaftohelix blakeana (Newcomb, 1865): synonym of Ainohelix blakeana (Newcomb, 1865) (unaccepted combination)
 Karaftohelix bocageana (Crosse, 1864): synonym of Bradybaena bocageana (Crosse, 1864) (unaccepted combination)
 Karaftohelix chishimana (Pilsbry & Hirase, 1904): synonym of Eulota chishimana Pilsbry & Hirase, 1904: synonym of Karaftohelix blakeana (Newcomb, 1865): synonym of Ainohelix blakeana (Newcomb, 1865) (unaccepted combination)
 Karaftohelix intermedia (Rymzhanov, 1983): synonym of Fruticicola intermedia (Rymzhanov, 1983) (unaccepted combination)

References

 Bank, R. A. (2017). Classification of the Recent terrestrial Gastropoda of the World. Last update: July 16, 2017

Camaenidae